Friedrich Gundolf, born Friedrich Leopold Gundelfinger (20 June 1880 – 12 July 1931) was a German-Jewish literary scholar and poet and one of the best known academics of the Weimar Republic.

Education 

Gundolf, who was the son of a mathematician, studied art history and German language and literature at the universities of Munich, Berlin and Heidelberg. He received his doctorate in 1903 and completed his Habilitation (attainment of professor's status) eight years later. His habilitation work about "Shakespeare and the German spirit" (Shakespeare und der deutsche Geist, 1911), marked a turning point in German language and literature studies.

He also was an important member of the Georgekreis, which he joined in 1899. He published first poems in Stefan George's periodical, the Blätter für die Kunst. During 1910 and 1911, he edited the Jahrbuch für die geistige Bewegung (Yearbook for the Spiritual Movement), which preached the cultural political opinions of the Georgekreis. Gundolf and Stefan George stayed on good terms for more than twenty years, but later, George broke completely with him, on the occasion of Gundolf's marriage in 1926.

In his works in literary studies, Gundolf took a new, historically-oriented view on literature, which centered on the philosophically determined registration of the poet. To him, the great writers (such as Shakespeare and Goethe) were symbolic figures of their time, and in his academic research he sought to present not only the artists themselves, but also the effects of their works.

From 1916 to the late 1920s, Friedrich Gundolf was professor at Heidelberg University. In 1921, one of his students was Joseph Goebbels, later the Nazi propaganda minister, who at that time admired Gundolf and his colleague Max Freiherr von Waldberg. Von Waldberg subsequently became Goebbels's advisor when he wrote his doctoral dissertation. Gundolf also befriended the economist and fellow Heidelberg professor Arthur Salz.

Death and legacy
In 1927, Gundolf was diagnosed with cancer, and died of it four years later. Gundolf's works were banned by the Nazis in 1933. He had married Agathe Mallachow (1884–1983) who was a pianist. Their daughter who became an Italian language professor and expert in literature, Cordelia Gundolf, was the godchild of graphic artist, Melchior Lechter. After the death of her father and as Hitler assumed power in Germany, her mother asked Albert Einstein for advice. This led the family to escape to Capri and subsequently to Rome.

Works 

His best known publication is Goethe (1916) (13th edition in 1930), in which he radicalized the principles of his view on figures. In 1964 the Deutsche Akademie für Sprache und Dichtung founded the annual Friedrich-Gundolf-Preis for the inter-mediation of German culture in foreign countries.

References

"Gundolf, Friedrich" The Oxford Companion to German Literature (3 ed.)

External links 
 
 Gundolf papers at the University of London
 

1880 births
1931 deaths
20th-century German poets
20th-century German male writers
German male poets
Heidelberg University alumni
Jewish poets
Writers from Darmstadt
People from the Grand Duchy of Hesse
Academic staff of Heidelberg University